Victorie Guilman (born 25 March 1996) is a French professional racing cyclist, who currently rides for UCI Women's WorldTeam .

Major results

2015
 10th Grand Prix de Plumelec-Morbihan Dames
2017
 5th Road race, National Road Championships
2018
 9th Kreiz Breizh Elites Dames
2019
 2nd Road race, National Road Championships
 4th La Picto–Charentaise
2020
 4th Road race, National Road Championships
 6th Overall Tour Cycliste Féminin International de l'Ardèche
2021
 6th Grand Prix Féminin de Chambéry
 7th La Périgord Ladies
2022
 2nd Grand Prix Féminin de Chambéry

References

External links

1996 births
Living people
French female cyclists
People from Angoulême
Sportspeople from Charente
Cyclists from Nouvelle-Aquitaine